In the siege of Mainz, from 14 April to 23 July 1793, a coalition of Prussia, Austria, and other German states led by the Holy Roman Empire besieged and captured Mainz from revolutionary French forces. The allies, especially the Prussians, first tried negotiations, but this failed, and the bombardment of the city began on the night of 17 June.

Siege
Within the town the siege and bombardment led to stress between citizens, municipality and the French war council, governing since 2 April. The city administration was displaced on 13 July; this increased the stubbornness of the remaining population. Since a relief army was missing, the war council was forced to take up negotiations with the allied forces on 17 July; the remaining soldiers capitulated on 23 July.

Nearly 19,000 French troops surrendered at the end of the siege, but were allowed to return to France if they promised not to fight against the allies for one year. Consequently, they were used to fight French royalists in the Vendée region of France. They left the town singing La Marseillaise (also known as the Chant de guerre de l'Armée du Rhin).

The Republic of Mainz, the first democratic state on the later on German territory, was subsequently dissolved. Mainz received a Prussian commander to administer the city. The bombardment had left devastating traces in the townscape: some civil buildings and aristocratic palaces like the comedy house, the electoral pleasure palace Favorite, the House of the Cathedral Provost, Liebfrauen- and the church of Society of Jesus had been destroyed, as well as St. Crucis, the Benedictine abbey St. Jacob on the citadel and the remains of St. Alban's Abbey. The cathedral had been heavily damaged.

The biggest impact of the occupation and siege was that the city's part in the old imperial electoral structure finally came to their end. Thus the events of the year 1793 also marked the end of Aurea Moguntia, the Latin nickname for the city: "Golden Mainz". The city lost its status as the electoral residence.

The shelling of Mainz was widely discussed in Europe. Many people gathered round the town in order to view the siege. Johann Wolfgang von Goethe assisted Duke Carl August of Saxe-Weimar during the siege and wrote a famous book about the siege

Related people
Friedrich Wilhelm Freiherr von Bülow
Carl von Clausewitz
Prince Louis Ferdinand of Prussia
Georg Forster
Heinrich von Kleist
Heinrich Menu von Minutoli
Karl Ludwig von Lecoq
Andreas Joseph Hofmann
Antoine Christophe Merlin
Jean Baptiste Kléber
François Christophe Kellermann
Jean Baptiste Meusnier
Louis Baraguey d'Hilliers
Claude Pierre Pajol
Jean Ambroise Baston de Lariboisière
Adam Gottlob Detlef Moltke
Joachim Moltke

References 
Smith, D. The Greenhill Napoleonic Wars Data Book. Greenhill Books, 1998.
 
Schmittlein, Raymond: Un Recit de Guerre de Goethe le Siege de Mayence II. Éditions Art et Science. Mayence. 1951. 
Arthur Chuquet: The Wars of the Revolution: The Siege of Mainz and the French Occupation of the Rhineland 1792–93.

External links
 Die Belagerung von Mainz  by Goethe in the Project Gutenberg.

Mainz, Siege of
Mainz, Siege of
Mainz, Siege of
Battles involving Hesse-Kassel
Conflicts in 1793
1793 in France
1793 in Austria
History of Mainz
Sieges of the War of the First Coalition
Battles of the War of the First Coalition
Sieges involving the Holy Roman Empire
Battles in Rhineland-Palatinate